Ejura is a town and the capital of Ejura/Sekyedumase, a district in the Ashanti Region of Ghana. Ejura has settlement population of 70,807 people. Ejura is the largest maize producing district in the Ashanti Region of Ghana. It is in the far north of the region, near the Afram River. Ejura is connected by highways with the towns of Mampong, Yeji and Techiman. Ejura is home to the Digya National Park / Kujani Game Reserve.

History

2021 shooting 

On June 28, 2021, two people were shot and killed by the security personnel in Ejura and four others were injured during a demonstration which turned violent. Ejura people are also ashanti people. the are living from agriculture. The traditional celebration of these people is Sikiyerene based on yam production.

References

Famous people from Ejura
Emmanuel Boakye born 1985 Ahodwo family Ejura footballer Ajax Amsterdam

Populated places in the Ashanti Region